Brett Williams (born 10 October 1965) is a New Zealand cricketer. He played in 22 first-class and 43 List A matches for Wellington from 1987 to 1997.

See also
 List of Wellington representative cricketers

References

External links
 

1965 births
Living people
New Zealand cricketers
Wellington cricketers
Cricketers from Wellington City